In Genesis 36:39, Pau (or Pai 1 Chronicles 1:50) or is the name of an Edomite city. It was the capital of the Edomite king Hadar. Some Biblical scholars identify Pau as an Egyptian city, based on the fact that Hadar's wife is named as an Egyptian.

Edom